Charlevoix is a region in the province of Quebec in Canada.

Charlevoix may refer to:

People with the surname
Pierre François Xavier de Charlevoix (1682–1761), French Jesuit and explorer in New France, after whom most of the place names are named, either directly or indirectly

Places

Canada
 Charlevoix, an historical and cultural region in Quebec which contains the following:
Charlevoix Regional County Municipality, Quebec
Charlevoix-Est Regional County Municipality, Quebec
Charlevoix impact structure

Electoral districts 
Charlevoix–Côte-de-Beaupré, provincial electoral district in Quebec
Charlevoix (provincial electoral district), former provincial district in Quebec
Charlevoix (electoral district), former federal district in Quebec
Charlevoix—Saguenay, former federal electoral district in Quebec

United States
Charlevoix, Michigan
Charlevoix County, Michigan, which contains the following:
Charlevoix Township, Michigan
Lake Charlevoix, Michigan
Charlevoix South Pier Light Station, Michigan

Transit

Canada
Charlevoix station (Montreal), a Montreal Metro station in Montreal, Quebec
Charlevoix Airport, Charlevoix region, Quebec
Charlevoix Railway, Charlevoix region, Quebec

United States
Charlevoix station (Michigan), a former station in Charlevoix, Michigan
Charlevoix Municipal Airport, Michigan